Alexander Shkurinskiy (born 11 April 1995) is a Russian handball player for HBC Nantes and the Russian national team.

He participated at the 2017 World Men's Handball Championship.

References

External links

1995 births
Living people
People from Krasnodar Krai
Russian male handball players
Expatriate handball players
Russian expatriate sportspeople in Belarus
Sportspeople from Krasnodar Krai